Ödenbach is a geographical name and may refer to:

Places
 Ödenbach (Breitnau), hamlet in the municipality of Breitnau in the county of Breisgau-Hochschwarzwald, Baden-Württemberg, Germany
 Ödenbach (Buch am Buchrain), dwelling in the municipality of Buch am Buchrain in the county of Erding, Bavaria, Germany

Rivers and streams
 Ödenbach (Bühler), right tributary of the Bühler above Senzenberg, Bühlerzell, Schwäbisch Hall, Baden-Württemberg, Germany
 Ödenbach (Kreuthbach), left tributary of the Kreuthbach near Bieg, Markt Colmberg, Ansbach, Bavaria, which empties into the Altmühl
 Ödenbach (Unkenbach), right tributary of the Unkenbach in the municipality of Unken, Zell am See, Salzburg, Austria, which flows into the Saalach

See also
 Odenbach (disambiguation)